Youssef Absi  (born June 20, 1946, in Damascus, Syria) is the current patriarch of the Melkite Greek Catholic Church since June 21, 2017.

Ecclesiastical career
On May 6, 1973, Youssef Absi was ordained a priest and became chaplain of the Missionary Society of St. Paul (Italian: Società dei Missionari di San Paolo; abbreviated as S.M.S.P.), a Melkite Greek Society of Apostolic Life that is also known as the Pères Paulistes. After the conclusion of philosophical and theological studies at the Major Seminary of St. Paul in Harissa, Lebanon, he obtained a licentiate in philosophy at the Lebanese University, a licentiate in theology at the Institute of St. Paul in Harissa, and a doctorate in musical science and hymnography at the Holy Spirit University of Kaslik.

On June 22, 2001, he was appointed titular archbishop of Tarsus dei Greco-Melkiti and curial bishop and auxiliary bishop in the Melkite Patriarchate. Patriarch Gregory III Laham was his consecrator, and the co-consecrators were Archbishop Jean Mansour, titular archbishop of Apamea in Syria dei Greco-Melkiti, and Archbishop Joseph Kallas, Archeparch of Beirut and Byblos, on September 2, 2001.

From 1999 to 2006, he was Superior General of his religious community, the Missionary Society of St. Paul. He assisted as co-consecrator at the episcopal ordination of Yasser Ayyash, Archbishop of Petra and Philadelphia in Jordan. In October 2007, he was appointed patriarchal vicar for the archdiocese of Damascus.

He was elected on June 21, 2017, as the patriarch of the Melkite Greek Catholic Church. His election came a month after Pope Francis accepted the resignation of Gregory III Laham.

Other activities
In 2001, he became president of the Syrian Caritas (Commission Commune de Bienfaisance (CCB)) and forwards with three full-time members more than 40 projects in Damascus, Aleppo and Hassake. He composed for the singer Marie Keyrouz "L'Ensemble de la Paix", a hymn that was released on the album Cantiques de l'Orient.

On the Middle East
As a participant in the Special Assembly of the Synod of Bishops on the Middle East in October 2010, he gave an address in which he insisted that: "The Episcopal Conferences of each country should meet from time to time together. You should allow bi-ritualism, so that no parish remains without divine liturgy, no matter what church it belongs to."

Gallery

References

External links

 melkite.org/patriarchate
 catholic-hierarchy.org
 gcatholic.org
 Spiritual Protector of the Order of Saint Lazarus
 https://web.archive.org/web/20100707121947/http://www.pgc-lb.org/english/Church2_Synod2006.html

1946 births
Melkite Greek Catholic Patriarchs of Antioch
Living people
Syrian archbishops
People from Damascus
Syrian Melkite Greek Catholics
Recipients of the Order of Saint Lazarus (statuted 1910)
Eastern Catholic bishops in Syria